The Washington Bridge is a series of three bridges carrying Interstate 195, US Route 6, US Route 44, and U.S. Route 1A over the Seekonk River connecting India Point in Providence to Watchemoket Square in East Providence, Rhode Island. The historic portion of the bridge dating to 1930 serves as the pedestrian crossing, and bike link to the East Bay Bike Path. The pedestrian span is also a part of the Washington-Rochambeau National Historic Trail.

History
Prior to the construction of bridges, tidal ferries provided the only means to cross the river.  Tides propelled the ferries along guide ropes anchored on both sides.  However, the ferries were unable to operate during bad weather, and travelers could be stranded on each side.  Replacing the ferries with bridges would be a major advance in transportation.

Previous spans

The first bridge in this general location was constructed in 1793, when John Brown's Providence South Bridge Company built a covered drawbridge. This bridge served as part of a turnpike that followed Taunton Avenue from Watchemoket Square to Taunton, Massachusetts. The same year, Brown's brother Moses built the Central Bridge (red bridge) to the north, connecting what are now the Providence and East Providence ends of Waterman Avenue. Replacements were built in 1807 and 1815 after each existing bridge was destroyed by weather.  A swing bridge was then built in 1885, and carried a street car line.

Current span

The original (southern) span of the current bridge was opened on September 25, 1930 as a bascule bridge. Designed by engineer Clarence W. Hudson and architect Carl L. Otto, both of New York City, it is dedicated to George Washington, in honor of his crossing with General Rochambeau. It linked the old Fox Point Boulevard on the Providence side with the intersection of Warren and Taunton Avenues - Watchemoket Square - both of which still terminate at the East Providence end of the bridge. The four-lane bridge, which carries two lanes in each direction, was marked by four approximately 15 ft high by 8 ft wide at the base by 3 ft deep (4.6x2.4x0.9 m) stone monuments, all having identical bronze dedications to Washington on them. The bridge structure itself, with its stone façade and arches under the roadway, is similar to the Arlington Memorial Bridge in Washington, D.C., on a shortened scale.

In 1959, the span, along with the approach roads, were redesignated as part of the newly created I-195, which, by the end of the year, extended to the Massachusetts border. However, it was determined that future congestion on the bridge was far too much for its future use. In 1968, a twin spanned bridge (which included retaining a portion of the original bridge to serve pedestrian/ bike traffic) was completed to the north of the original span. Separated by approximately twenty feet (6 m) the two interstate bridges were hemmed into the space afforded. It was at this time that two changes were made to the original bridge; the bascule section was permanently closed, as the new bridges were not designed to include bascule functions. The bridge monuments on the northern side of the bridge on each approach were relocated to the respective sides of the new western approach span, giving the bridge its final appearance.

In 1996, both bridges were repaired. The new bridge had large amounts of its steel understructure replaced, which required some lanes to be closed during the entire project. The old bridge was patched by closing lanes at night, cutting holes in the surface, performing repairs, and opening the lanes for the morning rush.

Segments of the bridge have fallen into a state of disrepair, such as the original 1930 segment now used as the pedestrian span. That portion had closed in July 2012, as RIDOT expanded the original infrastructure into a Linear Park. Much of the repair was limited by RI State budget constraints and other cost issues related to its age and the stress of multi-regional congested traffic traveling eastward to the Seekonk/Fall River suburbs and Cape Cod. Other than the Henderson Bridge located one mile to the north, the Washington Bridge is the only span traveling over the Seekonk River.

In the Washington Bridge project, the eastbound bridge was replaced. This involved building a portion of the new bridge in the gap between the two structures, moving traffic to the new bridge, then demolishing the left lanes of the old bridge to make room for the right lanes of the new one. The old control booths for the bascule section have been removed. The new span is now complete. Part of the original eastbound structure was preserved, and is being used as a bike and pedestrian route.

George Redman Linear Park

From 2012-2015, a bicycle and pedestrian park was constructed on a remaining section of the original Washington Bridge. The park opened in September 2015, at a total cost of $21.8 million. The park consists of an 11-foot-wide bicycle lane, a separated footpath paved with stamped concrete, and several seating areas. The path is completely separated from I-195 automobile traffic.

The linear park is named George Redman Linear Park, in honor of East Providence cyclist and park activist George Redman. A plaque honoring Redman can be seen on the west end of the park.

See also

Henderson Bridge
Crook Point Bascule Bridge

References

External links

Bridges completed in 1930
Bascule bridges in the United States
Bridges in Providence County, Rhode Island
Buildings and structures in Providence, Rhode Island
Road bridges in Rhode Island
Bridges on the Interstate Highway System
U.S. Route 6
U.S. Route 44
Bridges of the United States Numbered Highway System
1930 establishments in Rhode Island
Steel bridges in the United States
U.S. Route 1